The 40th New Brunswick Legislative Assembly represented New Brunswick between February 20, 1945, and May 8, 1948. It was elected in the 1944 New Brunswick general election and subsequent by-elections.

William George Clark served as Lieutenant-Governor of New Brunswick in 1945. He was succeeded by David Laurence MacLaren in November of that year.

Harry O. Downey was chosen as speaker.

The Liberal Party led by John B. McNair formed the government.

History

Members 

Notes:

References 
 Canadian Parliamentary Guide, 1948, PG Normandin

Terms of the New Brunswick Legislature
1944 establishments in New Brunswick
1948 disestablishments in New Brunswick
20th century in New Brunswick